Tales from the Neverending Story is a single-season TV series that is loosely based on Michael Ende's 1979 novel The Neverending Story, produced (in Montreal, Quebec, Canada during December 2000-August 2002) and distributed by Muse Entertainment, and aired on HBO in 2002. It was aired as 4 two-hour television movies in the US and as a TV series of 13 one-hour episodes in the UK. The first two television movies were released on DVD and VHS in 2002, followed by a complete series box set in 2004.

Departing from the canon of the 1979 novel The Neverending Story by Michael Ende, the overall story in the series explored the origin story of how Bastian discovers Fantasia from an even greater point of divergence from Michael Ende's novel than the 1984, 1990, and 1994 Warner Brothers films had previously depicted.

Events from the novel occur out of order, and specific plot points are reversed between characters. For example, in the novel and films, it is Bastian who enters the world of Fantasia, but here it is Atreyu who enters our world. The concept of Yin and yang is introduced by altering the nature of the Childlike Empress's relationship with Xayide. In the series they are sisters with opposing ideologies. The Old Man of Wandering Mountain also takes on a larger role in the series becoming a mentor of sorts to Atreyu in much the same way as Karl Konrad Koreander is for Bastian.

The series also introduces new supporting characters. Lucas and Marley are Bastian's friends who try to defend him from school bullies, and Fly Ry is a heroine whom Atreyu meets who is on her own Quest. Tales from The Neverending Story is the first live action adaption not to feature the characters of Nighthob, Teeny-Weeny, or Rockbiter.

Episodes

US version
 The Beginning   - Part 1
 The Gift        - Part 2
 Badge of Courage - Part 3
 Resurrection    - Part 4

UK version
 Heart of Stone        - Episode 1 (Pilot)
 The Nothing           - Episode 2
 The Luckdragon        - Episode 3
 Deleting Mr. Blank    - Episode 4
 The Gift of the Name  - Episode 5
 Home Sweet Home       - Episode 6
 The Sceptre           - Episode 7
 The Luck Stops Here   - Episode 8
 Badge of Courage      - Episode 9
 Deus Ex Machina       - Episode 10
 Stairway to Heaven    - Episode 11
 The Visitor           - Episode 12
 Resurrection          - Episode 13 (Finale)

Cast 
Mark Rendall as Bastian Balthazar Bux
Greg Kramer as Rip Rowdy
Noël Burton as Michael Bux
Emma Campbell as April
John Dunn-Hill as Koreander
Sally Taylor-Isherwood as Yonie
Audrey Gardiner as Childlike Empress
Tyler Hynes as Atreyu
Victoria Sanchez as Xayide
Johnny Griffin as Connor
Jane Wheeler as Laura Bux
Robert Crooks as Tartus
Stéfanie Buxton as Fly Girl
Emma Taylor-Isherwood as Olano
Edward Yankie as Mr. Blank
Amanda Tilson as Little Girl/Nanda
Stefano Faustini as Lucas
Brittany Drisdelle as Fallon
Valérie Chiniara as Marley

References

External links
 

2000s Canadian children's television series
2001 Canadian television series debuts
2002 Canadian television series endings
Canadian children's adventure television series
Canadian children's fantasy television series
HBO original programming
Television series about children
Television series by Muse Entertainment
Television shows filmed in Montreal
English-language television shows
High fantasy television series
TV series 2